In enzymology, a phenol beta-glucosyltransferase is an enzyme that catalyzes the chemical reaction

UDP-glucose + a phenol  UDP + an aryl beta-D-glucoside

Thus, the two substrates of this enzyme are UDP-glucose and phenol, whereas its two products are UDP and aryl beta-D-glucoside.

This enzyme belongs to the family of glycosyltransferases, specifically the hexosyltransferases.  The systematic name of this enzyme class is UDP-glucose:phenol beta-D-glucosyltransferase. Other names in common use include UDPglucosyltransferase, phenol-beta-D-glucosyltransferase, UDP glucosyltransferase, UDP-glucose glucosyltransferase, and uridine diphosphoglucosyltransferase.  This enzyme participates in starch and sucrose metabolism.

References 

 

EC 2.4.1
Enzymes of unknown structure